2100 Ra-Shalom is an asteroid and near-Earth object of the Aten group on an eccentric orbit in the inner Solar System. It was discovered on 10 September 1978, by American astronomer Eleanor Helin at the Palomar Observatory, California, who named it in commemoration of the Camp David Peace Accords.

Orbit and classification 

Ra-Shalom orbits the Sun at a distance of 0.5–1.2 AU once every 9 months (277 days). Its orbit has an eccentricity of 0.44 and an inclination of 16° with respect to the ecliptic.

It was the second Aten asteroid to be discovered after 2062 Aten, the family's namesake, also discovered by Helin in 1976. The group of Aten asteroids feature a semi-major axis of less than 1 AU. Of this group, Ra-Shalom has one of the smallest semi-major axes, just 0.832 AU.

It also comes within 30  gigameter (Gm) of Mars, Venus and Mercury. The closest approaches are to Mercury, to about 0.0784 AU (11.7 Gm).

Naming 

The minor planet's composed named was chosen by the discoverer to commemorate the Camp David Peace Accords between Egypt and Israel in September 1978, and as a symbol for the universal hope for peace. Ra is the Egyptian Sun-god, who symbolizes enlightenment and life, while Shalom is the traditional Hebrew greeting meaning peace. The official  was published by the Minor Planet Center on 1 November 1978.

Physical characteristics 

Ra-Shalom has been characterized as a C-type and X-type asteroid on the Tholen and SMASS taxonomic scheme, respectively. It has also been characterized as a K-type asteroid. In 1981, the asteroid was detected using radar, revealing a relatively smooth surface at decimeter scales.

Rotation period 

In August 2016, a rotational lightcurve of Ra-Shalom was obtained from photometric observations by American astronomer Brian Warner. Lightcurve analysis gave a well-defined rotation period of 19.89 hours with a brightness amplitude of 0.55 magnitude.

A large number of previous photometric observations gave a period between 19.79 and 19.8201 hours with a brightness amplitude between 0.3 and 0.41 magnitude.

Diameter and albedo 

According to Spitzer Space Telescope's ExploreNEOs survey, the Japanese Akari satellite, and NASA's Keck Observatory, Ra-Shalom measures between 1.98 and 2.79 kilometers in diameter and its surface has an albedo between 0.080 and 0.177. The Collaborative Asteroid Lightcurve Link adopts an albedo of 0.082 and a diameter of 2.78 kilometers with an absolute magnitude of 16.054.

Notes

References

External links 
 Lightcurve Database Query (LCDB), at www.minorplanet.info
 Dictionary of Minor Planet Names, Google books
 Asteroids and comets rotation curves, CdR – Geneva Observatory, Raoul Behrend
 
 
 

002100
Discoveries by Eleanor F. Helin
Named minor planets
002100
002100
002100
19780910